Government Degree College Bijbehara, (Urdu;) also known as GDC Bijbehara, is a University of Kashmir affiliated  co-educational degree college located in Bijbehara in the Indian union territory of Jammu and Kashmir. The college is affiliated with the University of Kashmir and recognised by the University Grants Commission of India under 2(f) and 12(b) of UGC Act, 1956. The college has been accredited by NAAC for the first time in 2019 and awarded Grade B.

Location
The college is situated in Nilandrus Bijbehara On Phalagam Road, in the Anantnag district  Jammu and Kashmir.

Establishment
Govt. Degree College Bijbehara was established in the year 2005. It started its operation from the year 2006. It was established during the chief-ministership of Mufti Mohammad Sayeed under Prime Minister of India's Reconstruction Plan. The college started its operations with only 22 students.

Courses offered
The college offer bachelor courses in Arts and Science streams with highly equipped science lab.

Bachelor courses
Bachelor of Arts
Bachelor of Science (Medical)
Bachelor of Science (Non-Medical)
Bachelor of Commerce

See also
List of colleges in Anantnag

References

Degree colleges in Kashmir Division
Universities and colleges in Jammu and Kashmir
University of Kashmir
2005 establishments in Jammu and Kashmir
Educational institutions established in 2005
Colleges affiliated to University of Kashmir